Mick Neville may refer to:

 Mick Neville (footballer) (born 1960), former Irish footballer
 Mick Neville (hurler born 1891) (1891–1973), Irish hurler for Dublin and Limerick
 Mick Neville (Wexford hurler) (1887–?), Irish hurler for Wexford

See also
Michael Neville (disambiguation)